The women's freestyle 51 kg is a competition featured at the 2012 World Wrestling Championships, and was held at the Millennium Place in Strathcona County, Alberta, Canada on 27 September 2012.

This freestyle wrestling competition consisted of a single-elimination tournament, with a repechage used to determine the winners of two bronze medals. The two finalists faced off for gold and silver medals. Each wrestler who lost to one of the two finalists moved into the repechage, culminating in a pair of bronze medal matches featuring the semifinal losers each facing the remaining repechage opponent from their half of the bracket.

Each bout consisted of up to three rounds, lasting two minutes apiece. The wrestler who scored more points in each round was the winner of that rounds; the bout finished when one wrestler had won two rounds (and thus the match). 

Jessica MacDonald from the host nation won the gold medal.

Results
Legend
F — Won by fall

Main bracket

Repechage

References
Results Book – Page 15

Women's freestyle 51 kg
World